Franco Florio (born 18 April 1976) is an Italian former footballer who playsed as a midfielder.

References

1976 births
Living people
Sportspeople from Cosenza
Italian footballers
Cosenza Calcio players
A.S. Roma players
Calcio Foggia 1920 players
A.C. Ancona players
A.C. Monza players
Treviso F.B.C. 1993 players
Rende Calcio 1968 players
Serie B players
Serie C players
Italian football managers